Belyuen may refer to the following places in the Northern Territory of Australia.

Belyuen Shire, a local government area 
Belyuen, Northern Territory, a locality
 Belyuen School  –   see List of schools in the Northern Territory#Remote schools